Santa Cruz, is the primary tourist neighborhood of Seville, Spain, and the former Jewish quarter of the medieval city. Santa Cruz is bordered by the Jardines de Murillo, the Real Alcázar, Calle Mateos Gago, and Calle Santa María La Blanca/San José.  The neighbourhood is the location of many of Seville's oldest churches and is home to the Cathedral of Seville, including the converted minaret of the old Moorish mosque Giralda.

History 
Santa Cruz was Seville's old judería (Jewish quarter): when Ferdinand III of Castile conquered the city from Muslim rule, he concentrated the city's Jewish population—second in the Iberian Peninsula only to that of Toledo—in this single neighborhood.
After the Alhambra Decree of 1492 expelled the Jews from Spain, the neighborhood went downhill. In the 18th century, the neighborhood underwent a major process of urban renewal, including the conversion of a former synagogue into the current Church of Saint Bartholomew.

Just outside the neighborhood is the Iglesia de Santa María de las Nieves ("Church of Saint Mary of the Snows"), better known as the Iglesia de Santa María la Blanca ("Saint Mary the White"), a converted 14th century Mudéjar synagogue.

Origin of the name 
The present-day Plaza de Santa Cruz was once the site of the Iglesia de Santa Cruz (Church of the Holy Cross), a parish church that gave its name to the neighborhood. The church in Mudéjar style was constructed over the ruins of a synagogue, incorporating the floor of that older building. During the Napoleonic Wars the church was demolished as part of an urban renewal scheme, the old floor remained as the present plaza. The parish was moved to the monastery of the Clérigos del Espíritu Santo ("clerics of the Holy Spirit"), now the current Iglesia de Santa Cruz in Calle Mateos Gago (Mateos Gago Street). The present church houses a painting of the Last Supper by 17th century painter (and Santa Cruz resident) Bartolomé Esteban Murillo; Murillo was buried in the demolished parish church where the plaza now stands.

The labyrinth 

The Barrio de Santa Cruz is a labyrinth of narrow streets and alleys dating back to the old judería. These narrow streets provide protection from the oppressive sun of the Sevillian summer. Scattered through the neighborhood are several plazas or squares. Among these are the aforementioned Plaza de Santa Cruz, the Plaza de los Venerables, the Plaza de las Cruces, the Plaza de Doña Elvira, and the Plaza de los Refinadores. The Plaza de Santa Cruz, on the site of an old parish church and an older synagogue, has at its center an elaborate 17th century wrought iron cross, the Cruz de la Cerrajería ("Locksmith's Cross"). The Plaza de los Venerables is full of bars and terraces. Its name is believed to come from the onetime Hospital para Venerables Sacerdotes; it may have been the birthplace of Don Juan Tenorio. The tiny Plaza de las Cruces, has three columns, each topped by a cross. The elegant Plaza de Doña Elvira, with its azulejos (tiles), orange trees, fountains, and brick-and-tile benches, once a corral de comedias (a type of open-air theater), is the supposed birthplace of Don Juan Tenorio's impossible love, the mythical Doña Inés de Ulloa, daughter of Don Gonzalo. The Plaza de los Refinadores has a graceful sculpture of Don Juan. Other plazas are the Plaza de Alfaro and the Plaza de la Alianza (formerly Plaza del Pozo Seco), along the city wall. Besides these public squares, one can glimpse (and smell) the flowering plants in the patios of private houses.

The Callejón del Agua, an alley parallel to the city walls, was once the route along which water was brought to the royal Alcázar of Seville, and was once the home of the American writer Washington Irving, as is recorded by a plaque made by Mariano Benlliure. The alley also leads to one of the exits from the neighborhood, via the Jardines de Murillo. Another exit from Santa Cruz is the Callejón de la Judería and the enormous Patio de Banderas adjacent to the Alcázar and the city walls.

The Calle de las Cruces has two wooden crosses on a painted red wall; the Calle de Santa Teresa is the site of the Casa de Murillo and of a 17th-century Carmelite convent founded by Saint Teresa of Ávila; the Calle de Lope de Rueda is known for its mansions; the Calle Mateos Gago gives one of the best views of the Giralda. Other streets are less famous, but no less beautiful: the Calle de la Gloria, Calle Mezquita, Calle Vida, Calle Pimienta, Calle Justino de Neve, Calle Jamerdana and Calle Susona (formerly Calle de la Muerte).

Streets
 Calle Pimienta
 Calle Justino de Neve
 Callejón del Agua
 Calle Vida
 Calle Susona
 Calle de la Judería
 Calle Jamerdana
 Calle Gloria
 Calle Aire
 Calle Mateos Gago
 Calle Tintes

Plazas 
 Plaza de la Alianza
 Plaza de Alfaro
 Plaza de Doña Elvira
 Plaza de la Escuela de Cristo
 Plaza de los Refinadores
 Plaza de Santa Cruz
 Plaza de Santa Marta
 Plaza del Triunfo
 Plaza de los Venerables
 Plaza Virgen de los Reyes
 Patio de Banderas

Notable buildings 
 Palacio de Altamira
 Iglesia de Santa Cruz
 Iglesia de Santa María la Blanca
 Iglesia de San José
 Convento de Madre de Dios
 Hospital de los Venerables
 Palacio de Altamira
 Postigo de la Judería or the Torre del Agua, in the callejón de la Judería

Neighbourhoods of Seville
Tourist attractions in Seville
Articles containing video clips